Placówka is a Polish historical film. It was released in 1979.

References

External links
 

1979 films
Polish historical films
1970s Polish-language films
1970s historical films